Wilson School may refer to:

 The Woodrow Wilson School of Public and International Affairs at Princeton University, Princeton, New Jersey

or it may refer to:

also in the United States
(by state)
 Wilson High School, also known as Wilson School, in Lauderdale County, Alabama
 Woodrow Wilson Junior High School (Terre Haute, Indiana), listed on the NRHP in Indiana
 Wilson School (Clear Spring, Maryland), listed on the National Register of Historic Places in Maryland
 The Wilson School (St. Louis, Missouri), an Independent School and member of NAIS and ISACS
 Woodrow Wilson School (Fargo, North Dakota), listed on the NRHP in North Dakota
 Wilson School (Henryetta, Oklahoma), listed on the NRHP in Oklahoma
 Woodrow Wilson Junior High School (Eugene, Oregon), listed on the NRHP in Oregon
 Woodrow Wilson Junior High School (Philadelphia, Pennsylvania), listed on the NRHP in Pennsylvania
 Wilson School (Mannington, West Virginia), listed on the NRHP in West Virginia

See also
Wilson High School (disambiguation)
Woodrow Wilson High School (disambiguation)
Woodrow Wilson Junior High School (disambiguation)